Raoul Fristeau (11 June 1888 – 25 November 1964) was a French fencer. He competed in the individual and team sabre events at the 1928 Summer Olympics.

References

External links
 

1888 births
1964 deaths
French male sabre fencers
Olympic fencers of France
Fencers at the 1928 Summer Olympics